Independent School District 194 is a state and nationally recognized K-12 public school district located in Lakeville, Minnesota.

Also known as the Lakeville School District, District 194 serves approximately 11,084 students in grades Early Childhood-12 and is one of the fastest growing school districts in Minnesota.

District 194 has eight elementary schools (grades K-5), three middle schools (grades 6–8), and two high schools (grades 9–12).  District 194 offers preschool, ECFE, before and after school care, and general youth and adult classes through Community Education.

District 194 Schools
There are 13 schools in ISD194.

District 194 high schools

Both District 194 high schools compete in the South Suburban Conference of the Minnesota State High School League.

 Lakeville North High School
 Lakeville South High School
 Lakeville Area Learning Center (alternative)

District 194 middle schools

There are 3 middle schools in the Lakeville Area Middle Schools, all of which compete in the National Geographic GeoBee.

 Kenwood Trail Middle School
 Century Middle School
 McGuire Middle School

District 194 elementary schools

 Cherry View Elementary School
 Christina Huddleston Elementary School
 Eastview Elementary School
 John F. Kennedy Elementary School
 Lakeview Elementary School
 Lake Marion Elementary School
 Oak Hills Elementary School
 Impact Academy at Orchard Lake Elementary School
 9th Elementary School (currently being constructed)

References

External links
 Independent School District 194 Website
 Lakeville North High School
 Lakeville South High School
 Lakeville Area Public Schools launches new website and brand

See also
List of school districts in Minnesota

School districts in Minnesota
Education in Dakota County, Minnesota
Education in Scott County, Minnesota
Burnsville, Minnesota
School districts established in 1878
1878 establishments in Minnesota